In mathematics, a modular invariant may be
 A modular invariant of a group acting on a vector space of positive characteristic
 The elliptic modular function, giving the modular invariant of an elliptic curve.